Milan Chvostek (October 4, 1932 – November 8, 2018) was a producer/director at the Canadian Broadcasting Corporation.  He worked on A Case for the Court, The Lively Arts, This Hour Has Seven Days, Science Magazine and the CBC's flagship show The Nature of Things, a science documentary television show that has aired in nearly fifty countries worldwide and features scientist David Suzuki.  Awards for Chvostek's shows include one from the Monte Carlo Television Festival awarded by Prince Rainier III in 1975, and the Bell Northern Research Communications Award for science programming from the Canadian Science Writers' Association (Chvostek is the only three-time winner of this award) in 1974 and 1975.

After a decade of teaching television broadcast at Seneca College, Toronto (1986 to 1996), he embarked upon a freelance videography and photography career, working both independently and in partnership with his wife, journalist Isobel Warren.

Chvostek's photos appeared in the Toronto Star, Good Times Magazine, the National Post, Forever Young, Tandem, Tourist and in Florida, Eh? as well as in-flight magazines, Atmosphere (Canada 3000) and Airborn (Skyservice).

Singer/songwriter Annabelle Chvostek is his daughter.

References

1932 births
2018 deaths
Artists from Toronto
Canadian people of Slovak descent
Canadian radio producers
Canadian photographers
Canadian television directors
Toronto Metropolitan University alumni
Academic staff of Seneca College